Dub Chamber 3 is the eleventh solo album by American composer Bill Laswell, released on April 25, 2000, by ROIR.

Track listing

Personnel 
Adapted from the Dub Chamber 3 liner notes.
Musicians
Karsh Kale – tabla and drums (1)
Bill Laswell – bass guitar, keyboards, drum programming, producer
Nils Petter Molvær – trumpet and effects (3)
Nicky Skopelitis – six-string guitar, twelve-string guitar, drum programming, effects
Craig Taborn – electric piano (1, 3, 4)
Jah Wobble – bass guitar (4)
Technical personnel
John Brown – photography, design
Michael Fossenkemper – mastering
Robert Musso – engineering

Release history

References

External links 
 Dub Chamber 3 at Bandcamp
 

2000 albums
Bill Laswell albums
Albums produced by Bill Laswell
ROIR albums